Happiness Is... Part 2 is a 2019 Russian family film. The sequel to the film Happiness is... (2015).

Plot 
An almanac of seven winning, upbeat, upbeat, Disney-winning film novels. Several aspiring filmmakers have tried to figure out what happiness is and how to achieve it.

Cast 
 Irina Alfyorova as Svetlana
 Yelena Valyushkina as Claudia
 Mariya Shalayeva	 as mother 
 Aglaya Tarasova as Tonya
 Nikita Volkov as Andrey
 Leonid Yakubovich as grandfather
 Stanislav Duzhnikov as Tumanov
 Lyudmila Chursina as Dementyeva
 Ksenia Alfyorova as Veronica
 Darya Moroz as Hannah

References

External links 
 

2019 films
2010s Russian-language films
Russian sequel films
Russian anthology films
Russian children's films
Russian romantic drama films